Emirate of Granada was an Islamic realm in southern Iberia during the Late Middle Ages

Kingdom of Granada may also refer to:
 in Europe
 Taifa of Granada, earlier state ruled by the Zirids from 1013 to 1090
 Kingdom of Granada (Crown of Castile), a territorial jurisdiction of the Crown of Castile from 1492 until 1833
 in America
 New Kingdom of Granada, the name given to a group of colonial provinces in northern South America, an area corresponding mainly to modern-day Colombia
 Viceroyalty of New Granada, the name given to the jurisdiction of the Spanish Empire in northern South America, corresponding to modern Colombia, Ecuador, Panama and Venezuela

See also 
 Grenada (disambiguation)
 Granada (disambiguation)
 Grenade (disambiguation)